Julien Lorcy (born April 12, 1972) was a French professional boxer who held the WBA lightweight title twice.

Amateur career 
Record: 65-4 (36 KO)
1990 French National Amateur Featherweight Champion
1991 French National Amateur Featherweight Champion
1991 World Championship Featherweight competition in Sydney, Australia. Results were:
Defeated Billy Irwin (Canada) on points
Lost to Marco Rudolph (Germany) on points
Qualified for the Olympics as a Lightweight, in trials at Berck, France. Results were:
Defeated Thomas Damgaard (Denmark) on points
Defeated Giuseppe Pasquini (Italy) on points
Defeated Tontcho Tontchev (Bulgaria) on points
Defeated Dariusz Snarski (Poland) on points
At the 1992 Barcelona Olympic Games, lost in the quarterfinals in Lightweight competition. Results were:
Defeated Kamel Marjouane (Morocco) on points
Defeated Shigeyuki Dobashi (Japan) TKO 2
Lost to Marco Rudolph (Germany) on points

Professional career 
Nicknamed "Bobo, Julien Lorcy turned pro in 1991 and won the WBA Lightweight Title in 1999 after upsetting countryman Jean Baptiste Mendy.  He lost the title in his first defense to Italian Stefano Zoff later that year.

Lorcy captured the WBA Lightweight Title again in 2001 with a decision over Takanori Hatakeyama, but again lost the title in his first defense to Raul Horacio Balbi.  He retired in 2004 after a loss to Juan Diaz in a final bid for the WBA title.

He won his first title, the EBU super featherweight belt, from Boris Sinitsin in 1996. He challenged for the WBO super featherweight belt three times but never won it, fighting two draws against Arnulfo Castillo on March 1 [ 1 ] and October 4, 1997 [ 2 ] and losing on points to Anatoly Alexandrov [ 3 ] in 1998.

Lorcy then moved to lightweight and took the WBA belt from countryman Jean-Baptiste Mendy on April 10, 1999 by 6th-round stoppage. He lost this belt in his next fight, getting beaten on points by Italian Stefano Zoff on August 7, 1999) [4].

He then took the European lightweight title from Oscar Garcia Cano on January 31, 2000 and defended it on September 16 from Italian Gianni Gelli. On July 1, 2001, he beats Takanori Hatakeyama to again become a WBA champion. But in his first defense, he was beaten by Raul Horacio Balbi.

References

External links 
 

1972 births
Living people
Sportspeople from Argenteuil
Lightweight boxers
World Boxing Association champions
World boxing champions
Olympic boxers of France
French male boxers
Boxers at the 1992 Summer Olympics